Hanover Park is a station on Metra's Milwaukee District West Line in Hanover Park, Illinois. In Metra's zone-based fare system, Hanover Park is in zone F. As of 2018, Hanover Park is the 29th busiest of Metra's 236 non-downtown stations, with an average of 1,238 weekday boardings.

As of December 12, 2022, Hanover Park is served by 42 trains (20 inbound, 22 outbound) on weekdays, by all 24 trains (12 in each direction) on Saturdays, and by all 18 trains (nine in each direction) on Sundays and holidays.

Parking is available on both sides of the tracks. The largest parking area is on West Lake Street, and the second largest is on Ontarioville Road, both of which are west of County Farm Road. A third smaller parking lot exists on the southeast corner of the County Farm Road bridge on Liberty Street via Barrington Road.

Bus connections
Pace

References

External links 

Metra stations in Illinois
Former Chicago, Milwaukee, St. Paul and Pacific Railroad stations
Hanover Park, Illinois
Railway stations in Lake County, Illinois
Railway stations in DuPage County, Illinois